Karnataka Public Service Commission, chiefly known as KPSC is a government agency of Karnataka state, aimed to make recruitments to various civil services through competitive and departmental examinations in its jurisdiction under the area of 191,791 km2 (74,051 sq mi).

History 
Karnataka state was initially serving without having any recruitment agency. But on 16 May 1921, the government laid the foundation of the Central Recruitment Board. It was headed by a commissioner secretary on 19 January 1940 when the country was under British rule. After 5 years of the independence, the Public Service Commission was constituted on 18 May 1951 under the provisions of the Constitution of India and Public Service Commission Regulations 1950.  H.B. Gundappa Gowda, was appointed as the first Chairman and Sri George Matthan, and Sri H.M. Mallikarjunappa, as Members of the Commission in May 1951. Starting with Sri H.B. Gundappa Gowda, 13 Chairmen and 67 Members have been appointed to the Commission by Government.

Duties and functions
The commission perform its duties and functions in accordance with the Article-320 and Government of India act 1935. In case, the commission lack recruitment transparency or perform its duties arbitrarily, it is responsible to follow the judicial proceedings in order to determine and enforce legal rights.
To conduct examinations including civil and departmental for appointments in the state.
To advise the state government on all matters relating to the methods of recruitment.
To make appointments to civil services and promotions.
To advise the state government in transferring the officers from one service to another.
To grant pensions and awards in respect of injuries sustained by a person while serving under the Government in a civil capacity.
To consult the Union Public Service Commission in framing the rules and recruitment procedures.

Commission profile
The KPS Commission is headed by a Chairman, Secretary and other members for their specific roles.

See also

 List of Public service commissions in India

References 
 
Government of Karnataka
1951 establishments in Mysore State
State public service commissions of India
Government agencies established in 1951
KPSC HOME